Basey is a municipality in Samar, Philippines.

Basey may also refer to:

 Grant Basey (born 1988), Welsh former footballer
 Phil Basey (born 1948), Welsh former footballer

See also
 Base (disambiguation)
 Basie (disambiguation)
 Basye (disambiguation)